Helmut Heinrich Koester (December 18, 1926 – January 1, 2016) was an American scholar who specialized in the New Testament and early Christianity at Harvard Divinity School. His research was primarily in the areas of New Testament interpretation, history of early Christianity, and archaeology of the early Christian period.

Life
Koester was born in  Hamburg. He studied under Rudolf Bultmann at the University of Marburg, Germany, after being released from a POW camp there in 1945. He submitted his dissertation in 1954 and then became an assistant to Günther Bornkamm at the University of Heidelberg from 1954-1956. Koester began teaching at Harvard Divinity School in 1958 and became John H. Morison Research Professor of Divinity and Winn Research Professor of Ecclesiastical History in 2000. Koester was co-editor and chair of the New Testament editorial board of the commentary series "Hermeneia: A Critical and Historical Commentary on the Bible" published by Fortress Press (Minneapolis). He served as the president of the Society of Biblical Literature (1991), was member of the Studiorum Novi Testamenti Societas (SNTS) and was elected a Fellow of the American Academy of Arts and Sciences. 

Koester was an ordained minister of the Lutheran Church. In 1953, he married Gisela Harrassowitz, with whom he had four children, named Reinhild, Almut, Ulrich, and Heiko. He had three grandchildren including Christopher, Lukas, and Alexander. He died on January 1, 2016, at the age of 89.

Work
In his dissertation (published as Synoptische Überlieferung bei den Apostolischen Vätern, i.e. "Synoptic Tradition in the Apostolic Fathers"), Koester was able to demonstrate that much material in the so-called Apostolic Fathers that parallels elements in the Synoptic Gospels need not necessarily reflect dependence upon the written form of the Synoptics known to us. This was an extremely significant observation, and one with which all subsequent scholarship on early Christian gospel traditions would have to reckon. Among his numerous subsequent publications, his two-volume Introduction to the New Testament has become a standard reference work. Koester views the narratives of Jesus' virgin birth as having roots in Hellenistic mythology.

Controversy
Koester was alleged by Elaine Pagels to have sexually harassed her.

Select works

Books

Edited by

References

Sources

External links

1926 births
2016 deaths
20th-century American Lutheran clergy
20th-century American writers
21st-century American Lutheran clergy
21st-century American writers
American historians of religion
Fellows of the American Academy of Arts and Sciences
German emigrants to the United States
Harvard Divinity School faculty
Heidelberg University alumni
New Testament scholars
University of Marburg alumni
Writers from Hamburg